Viburnum carlesii, the arrowwood or Korean spice viburnum, is a species of flowering plant in the family Adoxaceae (formerly Caprifoliaceae), native to Korea and Japan (Tsushima Island) and naturalised in Ohio, USA. Round clusters of red buds open to strongly scented, pale pink flowers in late spring. These are followed in late summer by oval red fruits ripening to black in autumn.

The Latin specific epithet carlesii refers to William Richard Carles (1848–1929), a British plant collector in Korea.

The cultivars 'Aurora' and ‘Diana’ have gained the Royal Horticultural Society's Award of Garden Merit.

References

Flora of Japan
Flora of Korea
carlesii